Lola Casanova is a 1948 Mexican western film directed by Matilde Landeta and starring Meche Barba, Isabela Corona and Enrique Cancino. The film's sets were designed by Luis Moya.

The movie traces the history of a creole woman who goes to live with an Indian man to help the Indian community in their dealings with society.

Cast
 Meche Barba as Lola Casanova  
 Isabela Corona as Tortola parda  
 Enrique Cancino as Lobo zaino  
 Armando Silvestre as Coyote Iguana  
 José Baviera as Don Nestor 
 Carlos Martínez Baena as Don Diego Casanova  
 Ernesto Vilches
 Guillermo Calles     
 Ramón Gay as Juan Vega  
 Jaime Jiménez Pons as Indalecio 
 Miguel Montemayor as Romerito 
 Enriqueta Reza as Nana  
 Agustín Fernandez as Cuna de gato  
 Salvador Godínez as Casahuate  
 Enedina Díaz de León
 Carlos Villarías 
 Lupe Inclán as Lagartija  
 Emma Rivero
 Elisa Christy as Totoaba 
 Angeles Arreola
 Aurora Izquierdo
 Consuelo Múgica
 Jesús Chávez
 Felipe de Flores
 Genaro de Alba
 César del Campo 
 Rodolfo Moreno
 Rogelio Fernandez as Águila blanca  
 Lidia Franco as Otilia

References

Bibliography 
 Dever, Susan. Celluloid Nationalism and Other Melodramas: From Post-Revolutionary Mexico to fin de siglo Mexamerica. SUNY Press, 2012.

External links 
 

1948 films
1940s historical films
Mexican historical films
1948 Western (genre) films
Mexican Western (genre) films
1940s Spanish-language films
Films set in the 19th century
Mexican black-and-white films
1940s Mexican films